Baka and Test, known in Japan as Baka to Test to Shōkanjū, is an anime series produced by Silver Link based on the light novel series by Kenji Inoue. In a school in which students are able to summon beasts powered by their test scores, with higher scores resulting in ritzier lifestyles, the series revolves around a group of students stuck in the lowest-ranked F class. The first season aired in Japan between January 7 and March 31, 2010. On March 4, 2010, Funimation Entertainment announced that it had acquired the anime and streamed simulcast subtitled episodes days after they aired in Japan under the title Baka and Test – Summon the Beasts. Two OVA episodes under the title Baka to Test to Shoukanjuu: Matsuri. were released in two BD/DVD volumes: the first on February 23, 2011 and the second on March 30, 2011. Both OVA come with 2-3 different ending sequences. A second anime season under the title Baka to Test to Shoukanjuu Ni! began airing in Japan on July 8, 2011.

The first anime season had three pieces of theme music: one opening theme and two ending themes. The opening theme is "Perfect-area Complete!" by Natsuko Aso, composed by Kenichi Maeyamada. The first ending theme is "Baka Go Home" by Milktub and BakaTest All Stars. The second ending theme is "Hare Tokidoki Egao" by Hitomi Harada, Kaori Mizuhashi, Emiri Katou and Tomomi Isomura. The Matsuri OVAs had one opening theme and one ending theme. The second anime season has one opening theme and one ending theme. Funimation has also licensed the second season and the Matsuri OVA's, as with the first, they will simulcast the second series, followed by a Blu-ray and DVD release in 2012 . The second season by Funimation was initially released on January 15, 2013; however, an error on the box art caused a recall and a rerelease date. The official release date of the Funimation DVD/Blu-ray box set was January 29, 2013.

Episode list

Baka to Test to Shōkanjū (2010)

Baka to Test to Shōkanjū Matsuri (OVA)

Baka to Test to Shōkanjū Ni! (2011)

References

Baka and Test